Frisal is a Tehsil in district of Kulgam, Jammu and Kashmir, India. It is 14 km far from district headquarter. Frisal is situated at Bijbehara, Arawani-Kulgam road. It's boundaries connect three districts of South kashmir (Anantnag, Kulgam and Shopian). Frisal is 2nd largest town as per population in district Kulgam. The main source of income of this tehsil is agriculture. There are many springs in town Frisal and is known as town of springs in district Kulgam. Frisal town is economically and educationally weak and large population is below Poverty Line. Presently there are so many offices like Tehsil office, Block office, social welfare office,Model Hospital(not functional yet) Govt. Degree college,one Higher secondary and several educational institutions.

Geography

Demographics
 India census, Frisal had a population of 5,132. present population is over 8000

References

Jammu and Kashmir
Kulgam district